Rolando Ribera Menacho (born March 13, 1983 in Trinidad) is a Bolivian football midfielder. He currently plays for Nacional Potosí.

Club title

External links
 
 
 

1983 births
Living people
People from Trinidad, Bolivia
Association football midfielders
Bolivian footballers
Bolivia international footballers
Club San José players
Universitario de Sucre footballers